Jadam is the name of an Indian gotra, or clan, which forms part of the north-Indian caste group referred to as Ahir usually found in the state of Haryana, India.

The name has been traced by some historians to be a variant of the common clan name Jadav/Yadav.

See also
 Ahir
 Yadu
 Bhati

References

Ahir